Grandview Heights High School is a public high school in Grandview Heights, Ohio, a suburb of Columbus.  It is the only high school in the Grandview Heights City Schools district, which serves both the city of Grandview Heights and the village of Marble Cliff.

In 2021, the boys varsity soccer team won the Ohio High School Athletic Association (OHSAA) Division 3 State Championship, the first in the school's history. They won again in 2022. 

In 2022, the Grandview Heights High School Model United Nations team received an Award of Distinction (highest honor) for Research and Preparation, and an Award of Merit (third-highest honor) for Committee Participation at NHSMUN. Four members of the nine person team were invited to be plenary speakers at the closing ceremony of around 2,500 students, advisors, and directors. The team was recognized by the Office of the Governor of Ohio and the Ohio House of Representatives for their achievements.

References

External links
 District Website
 Search Grandview Heights High School Yearbooks
 School listing on localschooldirectory.com

High schools in Franklin County, Ohio
Public high schools in Ohio